Chavarat Charnvirakul (born 7 June 1936 in Bangkok) is a Thai politician. He had served as an Acting Prime Minister of Thailand as a result of the 2008 Thai political crisis.

Education
Chaovarat graduated from Thammasat University in 1966 with a degree in economics.

Political career
After spending many years in the public sector, he joined the government in 1994 as Deputy Minister of Finance, his tenure lasted till 1997. In 2008 he rejoined the government as Minister of Public Health and later Deputy Prime Minister of Thailand.

On 2 December 2008, the Constitutional Court ordered the dissolution of the People's Power Party and other coalition parties, at the same time banning their chief executives. The incumbent Prime Minister, Somchai Wongsawat, was then removed along with several other members of the Cabinet. Chaovarat, however, was the only senior Cabinet figure who was not a party executive and was therefore the only viable candidate. Either the House of Representatives of Thailand had to confirm him as the new Prime Minister, or the new political grouping must vote for a new leader and submit his name for approval. There has been some questions - even a letter submitted to the Constitutional Court by Senators - concerning the legality of his temporary appointment as Prime Minister (even in a caretaker capacity). This is because the 2007 Constitution of Thailand states that the Prime Minister must be a member of the House of Representatives; Chaovarat was not an MP. Chaovarat was replaced by Abhisit Vejjajiva on 15 December 2008. He was appointed Minister of Interior of Thailand in the Abhisit cabinet, a post which he held until the government's electoral defeat in 2011. On 14 February 2009, Chaovarat became the leader of the Bhumjaithai Party until 4 September 2012, in which he was succeeded by his son, Anutin Charnvirakul.

Royal decorations 
  Knight Grand Cordon (Special Class) of The Most Noble Order of the Crown of Thailand
  Knight Grand Cordon (Special Class) of the Most Exalted Order of the White Elephant
  Honorary Commander of the Most Excellent Order of the British Empire (CBE)

References

1936 births
Chavarat Charnvirakul
Chavarat Charnvirakul
Chavarat Charnvirakul
Cantonese people
Chavarat Charnvirakul
Chavarat Charnvirakul
Living people
Chavarat Charnvirakul
Chavarat Charnvirakul
Chavarat Charnvirakul
Chavarat Charnvirakul
Chavarat Charnvirakul
Chavarat Charnvirakul
Honorary Commanders of the Order of the British Empire
Chavarat Charnvirakul
Chavarat Charnvirakul